The Last Chapter is a television miniseries, broadcast in 2002, that describes a gang war with a US motorcycle gang, the "Triple Sixers", trying to open chapters in Ontario and Quebec.  The Globe and Mail reported that the resemblance between the Triple Sixers and the Hell's Angels Motorcycle club, was so strong that the club considered seeking an injunction to prevent broadcasting the series.

The series starred Michael Ironside and Roy Dupuis, who play characters that start as friends, but end up leading rival gangs in a deadly gang war.  Marina Orsini won a Gemini Award for her role as Ironside's wife.  Ironside won an award for his performance in a followup series first broadcast in 2003.

One unusual aspect of the series is that every scene with dialogue was filmed twice, in both French and English, to avoid the difficulties of filming in just one language, and then dubbing into the other language, in the studio.

References

2000s Canadian television miniseries
2000s Canadian drama television series
2002 Canadian television series debuts
CBC Television original programming
Canadian thriller television series
Works about organized crime in Canada
Works about outlaw motorcycle clubs